Julie Taylor (born 30 January 1970) is a Scottish rugby Union player. She played in Scotland's first international match against Ireland in 1993. She also played in the 1994 Women's Rugby World Cup and the 1998 Women's Rugby World Cup. She played her club rugby for Edinburgh Academicals.

References

1970 births
Living people
Scotland women's international rugby union players
Scottish female rugby union players